Woodson is a patronymic surname. It is also used, less commonly, as a given name. Notable people with the name include:

Surname
 Abe Woodson (1934–2014), American football player
 Ali-Ollie Woodson (1951–2010), American musician
 André Woodson (born 1984), American quarterback
 Benjamin N. Woodson (1908–2001), American insurance CEO
 Bill Woodson (born 1917), American voice artist
 Carter G. Woodson (1875–1950), African-American historian, author, journalist
 Charles Woodson (born 1976) American football cornerback
 Chazz Woodson (born 1982), American Major League Lacrosse player
 Darren Woodson (born 1969), American, former NFL player
 Herbert Woodson, American engineer
 Jacqueline Woodson (born 1963), American author
 Jamie Woodson (born 1972), American politician from Tennessee
 Julie Woodson (born 1950), American model
 Lewis Woodson (1806–1878), American educator and minister
 Mike Woodson (born 1958), American, former NBA player
 Robert Everard Woodson (1904–1963), American botanist
 Robert Woodson (born 1937), American community development leader
 Rod Woodson (born 1965), American football defensive back
 Ruby Garrard Woodson (1931–2008), American educator and cultural historian
 Samuel H. Woodson (Kentucky politician) (1777–1827), American politician from Kentucky
 Samuel Hughes Woodson (1815–1881), American politician from Missouri
 Silas Woodson (1819–1896), American, Governor of Missouri
 Tracy Woodson (born 1962), American, Major League Baseball player
 Warren B. Woodson (1903–1998), American college football coach
 Waverly B. Woodson Jr. (1922–2005), American soldier and health professional

Given name
 James Woodson Bates (1788–1846), American lawyer, statesman
 Sarah Jane Woodson Early (1825–1907), American educator and author
 Woodson T. Slater, (1858–1928), American, Associate Justice of the Oregon Supreme Court
 Jesse Woodson James (1847–1882), American outlaw

References

English-language surnames
Masculine given names
Patronymic surnames